Ben-my-Chree (meaning "girl of my heart" in the Manx language) may refer to six ships of the Isle of Man Steam Packet Company:

 
 
 
 
  (1998)

Ship names